US Post Office-Garden City is a historic post office building located at Garden City in the town of Hempstead, Nassau County, New York, United States. It was built in 1936 and designed by consulting architects Walker & Gillette for the Office of the Supervising Architect.  It is a one-story, square brick building on a granite in the Classical Revival style.  The lobby features a 1937 mural by J. Theodore Johnson titled "Huckleberry Frolic." On December 24, 1987, the building was named in honor of former Congressman John W. Wydler (1924-1987).

It was listed on the National Register of Historic Places in 1989.

Image gallery

References

Garden City
Government buildings completed in 1936
Neoclassical architecture in New York (state)
Garden City, New York
National Register of Historic Places in Hempstead (town), New York